John Ritchie MacNicol (August 31, 1878 – June 18, 1950) was a Canadian politician.

Born in Beaverton, Ontario, MacNicol was educated at public school, collegiates, and at Bryant & Stratton College in Buffalo, New York. He taught school in Algoma and Grey Counties, Ontario. From 1917 to 1920, he was president of the South York Liberal-Conservative Association.  From 1921 to 1922, he was president of the Ward 6 Toronto Association. From 1921 to 1923, he was secretary of the Liberal-Conservative Association of Ontario and was president from 1923 to 1930. He was president of the federal Conservative Party from 1925 to 1943.

He was first elected to the House of Commons of Canada for the Ontario riding of Toronto Northwest in the 1930 federal election. He was re-elected in 1935, 1940, and 1945 for the riding of Davenport. He was defeated by Paul Hellyer in the 1949 election.

Electoral record

References
 
 

1878 births
1950 deaths
Conservative Party of Canada (1867–1942) MPs
Members of the House of Commons of Canada from Ontario
People from Brock, Ontario
Progressive Conservative Party of Canada MPs
Bryant and Stratton College alumni